Carolina Éva Izsák Keményfy (born September 21, 1971 in Caracas) is a Venezuelan beauty queen who competed in the 1992 Miss Universe pageant on May 8, 1992 and placed fourth after being the leader of the competition that night.

Early life
Izsák was born to a Hungarian family. She was crowned Miss Venezuela 1991 representing the state of Amazonas. Her runner-up in the pageant was Ninibeth Leal of Zulia, who later would be crowned Miss World 1991.

Miss Universe
Izsák went on to represent her country in the 1992 Miss Universe pageant held in Bangkok, Thailand in May 1992.

When the pageant began, Izsák won all three preliminary competitions: swimsuit, interview and evening gown. Her score of 9.477 is the highest televised combined preliminary score in the pageant's history. Her nearest rival was Michelle McLean of the African nation of Namibia, coming after the preliminaries at second place with 9.147.

During the live telecast, Izsák continued her impressive scores and won the Top 10 swimsuit and evening gown competitions, coming in second only in the interview portion. When the 10 semifinalists were narrowed down to six finalists, Izsák entered in first place as the woman to beat. In the next round of competition, the judges' questions, she was asked by judge Khun Ying Sasima Srivikorn: "If you could know one thing about your future, what would you like to know?". Izsak answered that she does not want to know anything about her future even though she does project her life and tries to live every day as if it is her last. The jury did not give her high enough scores to make the top three, and Izsák finished in fourth place.

Life after Miss Universe
After the pageant, Izsák returned to Venezuela, where she completed her studies of architecture (Universidad Simon Bolivar) and eventually got married. She leads a life away from the spotlights, is a mother and currently resides in Boston, MA, USA.

See also
List of Venezuelan Americans

References

External links
Official Miss Venezuela website

1971 births
Living people
Miss Universe 1992 contestants
Miss Venezuela winners
People from Caracas
Venezuelan emigrants to the United States
Venezuelan female models
Venezuelan people of Hungarian descent
20th-century Venezuelan women